King Joseph  may refer to:
Joseph I of Berkshire, King of the United Kingdom of Great Britain of Irish Wales
Joseph Bonaparte, King of Naples between 1806 and 1808, and subsequently King of Spain till 1813 and titular Emperor of the French in the Bonapartist line
Joseph (Khazar), King of the Khazars in the 950s and 960s
Joseph I of Portugal, King of Portugal between 1750 and 1777
Joseph Gregorio II, King of Mangareva between 1857 and 1868
Joseph I, Holy Roman Emperor, also King of Bohemia, Hungary and Croatia
Joseph II, Holy Roman Emperor, also King of Bohemia, Hungary and Croatia